70 Ophiuchi is a binary star system located 16.6 light years away from the Earth.  It is in the constellation Ophiuchus. At magnitude 4 it appears as a dim star visible to the unaided eye away from city lights.

History
In the Ptolemy's 2nd-century Almagest star catalogue this star system is listed as a 4th magnitude star, the 28th (or 4th outside the constellation figure) in Ophiuchus. It is star No. 261 in this catalogue.

This star system was first catalogued as a binary star by William Herschel in the late 18th century in his study of binary stars. Herschel proved that this system is a gravitationally bound binary system where the two stars orbit around a common center of mass. This was an important contribution to the proof that Newton's law of universal gravitation applied to objects beyond the Solar System.  He commented at the time that there was a possible third unseen companion affecting the orbit of the two visible stars.

Variability

70 Ophiuchi is a variable star with a magnitude range for the two stars combined of 4.00 to 4.03.  The type of variability is uncertain and it is not clear which of the two components causes the variations.  It has been suspected of being either a BY Draconis variable or an RS Canum Venaticorum variable, and a period of 1.92396 days has been measured.

Binary star
The primary star is a yellow-orange main sequence dwarf of spectral type K0, while the secondary is an orange dwarf of spectral type K4.  The two stars orbit each other at an average distance of 23.2 AU. But since the orbit is highly elliptical (at e=0.499), the separation between the two varies from 11.4 to 34.8 AU, with one orbit taking 88.38 years to complete.

Claims of a planetary system
In 1855, William Stephen Jacob of the Madras Observatory claimed that the orbit of the binary showed an anomaly, and it was  "highly probable" that there was a "planetary body in connection with this system". This is the first known attempt to use astrometric methods to detect an exoplanet, although Friedrich Bessel had applied similar methods 10 years earlier to deduce the existence of Sirius B.

T. J. J. See made a stronger claim for the existence of a dark companion in this system in 1899, but Forest Ray Moulton soon published a paper proving that a three-body system with the specified orbital parameters would be highly unstable. The claims by Jacob and See have both been shown to be erroneous.

Discovery of a "third dark companion" was announced by Louis Berman in 1932. This "dark body" around 70 Oph A was thought to have an 18-year period and a mass of 0.1 to 0.2 the Sun's mass. A claim of a planetary system was again made, this time by Dirk Reuyl and Erik Holberg in 1943. The companion was estimated to have a mass 0.008 to 0.012 that of the Sun and a 17-year period. This caused quite a sensation at the time but later observations have gradually discredited this claim.

The negative results of past studies does not completely rule out the possibility of planets. In 2006 a McDonald Observatory team set limits to the presence of one or more planets around 70 Ophiuchi with masses between 0.46 and 12.8 Jupiter masses and average separations spanning between 0.05 and 5.2 AU.

See also
 61 Cygni
 Barnard's Star
 List of the nearest stars

References

External links
 Detection Limits from the McDonald Observatory Planet Search Program
 

Binary stars
Ophiuchi, 70
Ophiuchus (constellation)
K-type main-sequence stars
Ophiuchi, 70
0702
Ophiuchi, V2391
165341
088601
6752
Ophiuchi, p
Durchmusterung objects
Hypothetical planetary systems